Kawai Station is the name of two train stations in Japan:

 Kawai Station (Ibaraki) (河合駅)
 Kawai Station (Tokyo) (川井駅)